New Cambria is the name of several towns in the United States:

New Cambria, Kansas
New Cambria, Missouri